Scarves or scarfs are long pieces of fabric worn on or around the neck, shoulders, or head. This piece of fabric is used for warmth, sun protection, cleanliness, fashion, religious reasons, or to show support for a sports club or team. They can be made from various materials such as wool, linen, silk, or cotton. It is a common type of neckwear and a perennial accessory.

History

Scarves have been worn since ancient times. In 1350 BC Ancient Egypt, Queen Nefertiti is said to have worn a tightly woven headscarf, and the Statue of Ashurnasirpal II from the 9th century BC features the emperor wearing a shawl. In Ancient Rome, around AD 10, the garment was used to keep clean rather than warm. It was called a focale or sudarium (sudarium from the Latin for "sweat cloth") and was used to wipe the sweat from the neck and face in hot weather. They were originally worn by men around their necks or tied to their belts.

During the reign of the Chinese Emperor Cheng, from 259 to 210 BC, scarves made of cloth were used as military markers to identify officers or the rank of Chinese warriors. Many of the Terracotta Warriors are wearing them. In the 1200s AD, the Egyptian Belly dancers style used a scarf-like belt tied low on the hips to highlight their body movements. In 500 BC, in Athens women sported scarves to enhance their seductive charm, while during the same period, Indian women wore them flirtatiously as headgears.

Around the 17th century, scarves were worn by soldiers of all ranks in Croatia. The only difference in the soldiers' scarves that designated a difference in rank was that the officers had silk scarves, whilst the other ranks were issued cotton scarves. Some of the Croatian soldiers served as mercenaries with the French forces; their men's scarves were sometimes referred to as "cravats" (from the French cravate, meaning "Croat") and were the precursor to the necktie. The modern British "cravat" is called an "ascot" in American English.

During the French Revolution, women and men donned different coloured scarves to exhibit their political affiliations to democratic principles of - Liberté, Egalité, Fraternité, and Cravates. French epitomised with great ease the elegant scarf style. In French, "scarf" is a derivative of the Croatian word Karvata. Also, during these two wars, fighter pilots wore scarves to keep themselves warm in high altitudes and to cover their necks.

During World War I and II, women in the USA considered it a patriotic duty to knit scarves for the soldiers, along with other necessities.

In New England, bereaved families were given a scarf as a thank-you gift, as a mark of respect.

Napoleon Bonaparte found Egyptian scarves attractive and bought them as gifts for his wife. After this gift, Empress Josephine Bonaparte is believed to have acquired over 400 scarves in the following three years costing about £80,000. Following this, the people of Paisley, a town in Scotland, started manufacturing their own scarves.

The scarf became a real fashion accessory by the early 19th century for both men and women. By the middle of the 20th century, scarves became one of the most versatile clothing accessories for both men and women.

During the entire 20th century, the fashion industry adopted the scarf in a big way. Thierry Hermès of Hermès created silk scarves modelled after scarves Napoleon's soldiers wore in battle. Hermes, the biggest name in the fashion industry, started making scarves which were designed by artists and singers of the biggest names in the fashion and music industry in Hollywood; Hollywood actresses Grace Kelly fashioned one of Hermes's scarves. Hermes, imported raw silk directly from China which was spun into yarn and then made into a more long-lasting high-quality fabric with hand print; it is said these scarfs involved 43 screens giving its colour effects, and this printed scarf design was exhibited in a picture by two women in white wigs playing a game.

Silk scarves were also fashioned by actresses like Faye Dunaway in the 1967 film Bonnie and Clyde and Diane Keaton in 1977's Annie Hall. Madonna, in the 1980s, corralled her epic perm with a subversive scarf. Thus, scarves do not show any evidence of fading away, as Alexander's much-copied silk skull scarves have generated rage among celebrities and fans alike.

Uses and types

Scarves are in vogue in four functional types, and these are: headscarves, neck scarves, beach scarves, and winter scarves, and are hand-painted, block-printed, dyed, embellished, embroidered, beaded, or laced.

Winter scarves used in cold climates are thick and knitted, often made of wool, alpaca, and similar warm materials, tied around the neck to keep warm. Sometimes called a muffler, this is usually accompanied by a heavy jacket or coat. Also, the scarf could be used to wrap around the face and ears for additional coverage from the cold.

In drier, dustier warm climates or environments with many airborne contaminants, a thin headscarf, kerchief, or bandanna is often worn over the eyes, nose, and mouth to keep the hair clean. Over time, this custom has evolved into a fashionable item in many cultures, particularly among women. The cravat, an ancestor of the necktie and bow tie, evolved from scarves of this sort in Croatia

In India, woollen scarves with Bandhani work adopting tie and dye technique are used commonly in Bhuj and Mandvi of the Kutch District of Gujarat State. In India, and elsewhere there is a trend now among members of a particular group of people to compulsorily wear scarf or dupatta as a safeguard against pollution.

In East Indies, in Malaya, Slenddangs constitute another item in the strictly native trade as a scarf or sash, 20 or 21 inches wide and 85 or 86 inches long, that is worn principally by the Malaya Women, being draped over one shoulder and across the body diagonally they are both printed and colour.

Scarves that are used to cover the lower part of the face, the neck, in particular, are sometimes called cowls. Scarves can be colloquially called a neck-wrap.

Scarves can be tied in many ways, including the pussy-cat bow, the square knot, the cowboy bib, the ascot knot, the loop, the necktie, and the gipsy kerchief. Scarves have also been tied in various ways on the head as a headscarf, transcending time. Monarchs, including Queen Victoria and Queen Elizabeth I, have worn the headscarf. During the late 1990s, it was a fashion trend with hip hop and R&B. During the period of silent films, actresses Anna May Wong and Evelyn Brent donned headscarves of sophisticated silks and popularised them. In Islamic religious culture, wearing a head scarf is linked to the Quran. It is said that in Saudi Arabia, wearing a head scarf was necessary to face the harsh climate and intense heat, even before Islam became their religion. During the same period, Christians and Jews also covered their hair with veils dictated by their sacred texts.

Scarves are also used as fashion accessories with evening gowns by draping them over the shoulders or arms; one example is the Feather boa.

In religious or cultural use

The ecclesiastical "scarf" was originally a loose wrap or muffler (band) to be worn around the neck out of doors. In the English Church, in post-Reformation times, the minister wore over the surplice the "scarf," which was a broad band of black silk with fringed ends arranged like the stole around the neck but falling nearly to the feet. Its use has been almost entirely replaced by that of the stole (q.v.), with which it has sometimes been wrongly confused.

Several Christian denominations include a scarf known as a stole as part of their liturgical vestments. In the English Church, the scarf of colour made of black silk, which is twice the width of a stole, is worn around the neck of chaplains, doctors of religion, and other personages. Mourners at funerals wear a black scarf made of silk or crape over the right shoulder. Scarves of coloured silk are worn on many public occasions and in their courts or lodges by members of many of the social order - such as Foresters, Odd fellows, etc.

In a procession  organised by the Masonic Lodge, Marshals wear the cocked hat, sword, and scarf, with a baton in his hand. In the procession the colour of the scarf is mandatorily blue for Subordinate Lodge, and purple for the Grand Lodge. Wikisource: Manual of the Lodge/Ancient Ceremonies of the Order/Regulations for Processions.

In uniforms
White Silk scarves in addition to knitted scarfs were used by pilots of early aircraft to keep oily smoke from the exhaust out of their mouths while flying. These were worn by pilots of closed cockpit aircraft to prevent neck chafing, especially by fighter pilots, who were constantly turning their heads from side to side, watching for enemy aircraft. Today, military flight crews wear scarves imprinted with unit insignia and emblems not for functional reasons but instead for esprit-de-corps and heritage.

The dress code adopted by pilots and air hostesses has undergone a sea change over time. In the early years of flying, aircraft pilots copied the pilots of World War I and adopted silk scarves and gloves as part of their outfit of flying boots and leather bomber jackets. But now, the modern commercial airline pilot's uniform has a distinct nautical cut to it. The air hostess's uniform has also undergone substantial changes, and wearing uniforms and scarves makes them distinctively attractive. Now the trend is to follow national traditions of dress. In this context, the air hostesses of Emirate Airlines drape scarf. Thai Airways cabin crew wear pink and purple silks with sashes; the Fiji Airways
air hostesses are seen wearing scarves with bula prints. Air Canada's dictum is — "Wear your scarf at all times!".

Students in the United Kingdom and Ireland traditionally wear academic scarves with distinctive combinations of striped colours identifying their university or college. This scarf, made from Saxony wool, usually measures 2 m in length of rectangular shape with tassels and two or more coloured stripes.

Members of the Scouting movement wear a scarf-like item called a neckerchief with a slide as part of their uniform, which is sometimes referred to as a scarf. Scouting's founder Lord Robert Baden-Powell introduced it in 1908. The idea was that if the scout was encountered with a bleeding injury and had to make a splint, a sling, or a bandage, the neckerchief could be used. In some Socialist countries, Young pioneers wore a neckerchief called a red scarf.

In sport

Worn since at least the early 1930s, when the phenomenon of scarves began in Britain, scarf-wearing became common in 1970s.
In the late 1990s, coloured scarves have been traditional supporter wear for fans of association football teams across the world, even those in warmer climates. These scarves come in a wide variety of sizes and are made in a team's particular colours, and may contain:

 The club or team crest
 Pictures of renowned players
 Various slogans relating to the club's history and its rivalry with others

Initially, these two-coloured scarves were called granny scarves as the players' grandmothers knitted them. At some clubs, supporters will sometimes perform a 'scarf wall' in which all supporters in a section of the stadium will stretch out their scarves above their heads with both hands, creating an impressive 'wall' of colour.

This scarf wall is usually accompanied by the singing of a club anthem, such as "You'll Never Walk Alone" at Liverpool F.C. or national anthem, such as "La Marseillaise" at France national football team. The socio-cultural anthropology of football is compared to a religious service by way of raising hands, singing the club's anthem, shouting slogans, jumping up and whistling and clapping. By the end of the 19th century, in Britain, football had graduated from an amateur game of the bourgeois into a professional working-class sport, and which over the decades became an international spectacle.

Under the Aussie rules, the Australian Football League commands the country's largest sport audiences. Its fans don apparel including scarves, knitted hats and shirts.

Overall, the team scarves in football matches represent fans' loyalty and are an insignia, not a protective piece of cloth. They are usually about 3 to 5 feet long with a width of 6 to 10 inches. Scarf sales are an important part of the football economy throughout Europe.

In football games, the supporters in the stadiums wear scarves (called "Scarfers") and shirts in club colours.

Manufacturing of scarves
Knitting garments such as scarves is an important trade in some countries. Hand-knitted scarves are still common as gifts as well.

Printed scarves are additionally offered internationally through high-fashion design houses. Among the latter are Burberry, Missoni, Alexander McQueen, Cole Haan, Chanel, Etro, Lanvin, Hermès, Nicole Miller, Ferragamo, Emilio Pucci, Dior, Fendi, Louis Vuitton and Prada.

The House of Hermès which made its first scarf in 1937, has produced more than two thousand different designs and still continuing with new designs. In the year 1937 itself the Hermès designed woodblock scarf made of Chinese silk was worn by Queen Elizabeth II of England, American First Lady Jacqueline Kennedy Onassis and Grace Kelly.

There are three basic scarf shapes: square, triangular and rectangular. the most common type is the square scarf which can be folded to form a rectangular or triangular scarf. A sash is usually a long and relatively narrow rectangle. The size of either can range from mini to maxi and anywhere in between. The style of the garment with which the finished scarf is worn will undoubtedly make a difference, as will the way you will tie it.

Gallery

See also
 Bandana
 Dupatta
 Headscarf
 Shawl
 Yellow Scarves Rebellion

References

19th-century fashion
20th-century fashion
 
Winter clothes
History of fashion